Taoufik Salhi  (born 21 August 1979 in Tunis) is a retired professional Tunisian football midfielder.

Career
At the end of January 2007, Salhi signed an 18-month contract with Zorya Luhansk.

In July 2010, Salhi joined Ukrainian Premier League side FC Sevastopol.

References

External links
 futebol365 
 

 

1979 births
Living people
Tunisian footballers
Tunisian expatriate footballers
Expatriate footballers in Kazakhstan
Expatriate footballers in Ukraine
Ukrainian Premier League players
Kazakhstan Premier League players
Club Africain players
Stade Tunisien players
FC Zorya Luhansk players
FC Sevastopol players
FC Oleksandriya players
CS Sfaxien players
FC Vostok players
FC Ordabasy players
Association football midfielders